Gionee is a Chinese smartphone manufacturer based in Shenzhen, Guangdong. Founded in 2002, it was one of China's largest mobile phone manufacturers. According to Gartner, its market share in China was 4.7% in 2012, and it expanded into other markets, including India, Taiwan, Bangladesh, Nigeria, Vietnam, Myanmar, Nepal, Thailand, the Philippines and Algeria .

History
In August 2016, Gionee India introduced their plans to build a manufacturing plant in India. At the same time, Gionee introduced its first Made in India smartphone with the introduction of the F103 model. The model was manufactured in a Foxconn plant in Sri City, Andhra Pradesh. In November 2018, it was reported that chairman Liu Lirong lost over US$144 million to gambling in a casino. On 10 December 2018, the Shenzhen Intermediate People's Court accepted the bankruptcy liquidation application filed by Huaxing Bank against Gionee.

On 01 March 2021, the company launched the Gionee Max Pro in India. The phone features a 6,000mAh battery, a 6.52-inch display, 3GB of RAM paired with 32GB inbuilt storage and can be expanded via microSD card.

Association with BLU Products 
BLU Products, a cell phone manufacturer based in Miami, Florida, sells many rebadged Gionee phones under their brand name in the United States and other North American markets, and engineers phones together with Gionee China and Gionee India.

Controversies
In 2014, it was shown by the German media that Gionee was delivering smartphones and tablets with pre-installed malware and viruses.

References

External links
Gionee Global
Gionee China 
Gionee India

Manufacturing companies based in Shenzhen
Electronics companies established in 2002
Chinese companies established in 2002
Mobile phone companies of China
Mobile phone manufacturers
Privately held companies of China
Chinese brands